Timothy Davis may refer to:

 Timothy Davis (activist) (born 1955), politician, cannabis rights activist from Missouri
 Timothy Davis (Iowa politician) (1794–1862), U.S. Representative from Iowa
 Timothy Davis (Massachusetts politician) (1821–1888), U.S. Representative from Massachusetts

See also
 Tim Davis (disambiguation)
 Timothy Davis-Reed, U.S. actor
 Timothy Davies (disambiguation)